Miłów  is a village in the administrative district of Gmina Maszewo, within Krosno Odrzańskie County, Lubusz Voivodeship, in western Poland.

The village has a population of 150.

Notable residents
 Willi Reschke (1922-2017), Luftwaffe pilot

References

Villages in Krosno Odrzańskie County